The 1914 Brighton by-election was held on 29 June 1914.  The by-election was held due to the resignation of the incumbent Conservative MP, John Edward Gordon.  It was won by the Conservative candidate Charles Thomas-Stanford, who was unopposed.

References

1914 elections in the United Kingdom
By-elections to the Parliament of the United Kingdom in East Sussex constituencies
1914 in England
Politics of Brighton and Hove
Unopposed by-elections to the Parliament of the United Kingdom (need citation)
20th century in Sussex
June 1914 events